Anne-Marie is a French feminine given name. It combines the two respective given names of Anne, and Marie. It is traditionally associated with Christianity because it joins the names of Jesus of Nazareth’s grandmother (Anne) and his mother (Marie) It may refer to:

People
 Queen Anne-Marie of Greece (born 1946), the wife of King Constantine II of Greece
 Anne-Marie Albiach (born 1937), French poet and translator
 Anne-Marie Alonzo (1951–2005), Canadian playwright, poet, novelist, critic and publisher
 Anne-Marie Cadieux (born 1963), Canadian actress, film director and screenwriter
 Anne-Marie Comparini (born 1947), French politician
 Anne Marie Cyr, French Canadian singer and TV presenter
 Anne-Marie David (born 1952), French singer
 Anne Marie DeCicco-Best (born 1964), 60th mayor of London, Ontario, Canada
 Anne-Marie Duff (born 1970), British actress
 Anne-Marie Ekström (born 1947), Swedish politician
 Anne-Marie Escoffier (born 1942), French politician and a member of the Senate of France
 Anne-Marie Fox, a Playboy magazine Playmate of the Month
 Anne-Marie Garat (born 1946), French novelist
 Anne-Marie Gélinas (born 1964), Montreal-based film, documentary and television producer
 Anne-Marie Goumba (born 1954), Central African Republic politician
 Anne-Marie Green (born 1978), Canadian-born American news anchor
 Anne-Marie Helder, British singer-songwriter
 Anne-Marie Hurst, lead vocalist for the groups The Elements, Skeletal Family and Ghost Dance
 Anne-Marie Hutchinson (1957–2020), British lawyer
 Anne-Marie Idrac (born 1951), current French Minister of State for foreign trade
 Anne-Marie Imafidon, computing, mathematics and language child prodigy
 Anne-Marie Irving (born 1977), former field hockey goalkeeper from New Zealand
 Anne-Marie Javouhey (1779–1851), French nun who founded the Sisters of Saint Joseph of Cluny
 Anne-Marie Johnson (born 1960), American actress and impressionist
 Anne-Marie Kantengwa (born 1953), Rwandan Patriotic Front deputy
 Anne-Marie Lizin (born 1949), Belgian politician
 Anne-Marie Loriot (born 1956), French sprint canoer
 Anne-Marie Losique, a television producer, television host and singer in Quebec, Canada
 Anne-Marie Marchand (born 1929), French costume designer
 Anne-Marie Martin (born 1957), Canadian actress and writer
 Anne-Marie Mediwake, Canadian television news anchor
 Anne-Marie Miéville (born 1945), Swiss filmmaker
 Anne-Marie Mineur (born 1967), Dutch politician
 Anne-Marie Morris (born 1957), British politician
 Anne-Marie Nicholson or Anne-Marie (born 1991), British female singer
 Anne-Marie Nzié (1932–2016), Cameroonian bikutsi singer
 Anne-Marie Pålsson (born 1951), Swedish politician
 Anne-Marie Payet (born 1949), a member of the Senate of France
 Anne-Marie Péladeau (born 1964), the daughter of Canadian businessman Pierre Péladeau
 Anne-Marie Ruddock (born 1963), English singer
 Anne-Marie Sirois, Canadian visual artist, writer and film director
 Anne-Marie Slaughter (born 1958), Director of Policy Planning for the U.S. State Department
 Anne-Marie Walters (1923–1998), WAAF officer and Special Operations Executive agent during the Second World War
 Anne-Marie Withenshaw, Canadian television and radio personality

Ann-Marie
 Ann Marie (born 1995), American musician
 Ann Marie Buerkle (born 1951), American politician
 Ann Marie Calhoun (born 1979), American violinist
 Ann-Marie Campbell (born 1965), Jamaican-American businessperson
 Ann Marie DeAngelo, American choreographer
 Ann Marie Doory (born 1954), American politician
 Ann Marie Fleming (born 1962), Canadian filmmaker, writer, and visual artist
 Ann-Marie MacDonald (born 1958), Canadian playwright and actor
 Ann Marie Sastry, American businessperson

Fictional characters
 Anne-Marie Byrne, in the BBC medical drama Holby City
 Anne-Marie Cortez, a mutant in the Marvel Comics Universe
 Anne-Marie, in the film All Dogs Go To Heaven
 Annemarie Johansen, the main character of the novel Number the Stars

See also
 Ann Marie, protagonist of the American television situation comedy That Girl
 Marie Anne

French feminine given names
Compound given names